Zhu Zhiqiang (born June 8, 1976) is a Chinese graphic designer, animator, writer, producer, and voice actor best known for his Xiao Xiao series of martial art stick figure videos. Zhu lives in Beijing, China, where he is an Internet phenomenon. He makes money from his animations using advertisements for major companies. Each of his designs features the "logo" Xiao Xiao. Zhu began animating stick figure videos in 1989 at the age of thirteen and rapidly gained popularity from 2000 to 2002 for his videos, most notably his Xiao Xiao series which debuted in 2001. In July 2004, Zhiqiang sued Nike, Inc. for unauthorized use of his stickfigure designs in an advertisement; Nike representatives denied the accusations, claiming that the stickman figure lacks originality, and is public domain. Nike lost the initial suit, and was ordered to compensate Zhu with the equivalent of USD$36,000. Nike stated it would appeal the suit in the Beijing High People's Court. Nike won the appeal in 2006, with the judge saying in the paper that the Nike stickman design was different than Zhu's stickman design. After winning the suit, Nike stated "This was never a commercial issue for us. It was a matter of principle."

Filmography

References

Chinese animators
Chinese animated film directors
Chinese animated film producers
1976 births
Living people
Chinese male voice actors
Artists from Beijing
Male actors from Beijing
Chinese video game designers